The Heart of Maryland is a lost<ref>[http://lcweb2.loc.gov/diglib/ihas/loc.mbrs.sfdb.5957/default.html The Library of Congress American Silent Feature Film Survival Catalog:The Heart of Maryland]</ref> 1915 silent film drama directed by Herbert Brenon based on David Belasco's play The Heart of Maryland. Mrs. Leslie Carter, who starred in the original play on Broadway in 1895, makes her appearance in this film as the title character.

Cast
Mrs. Leslie Carter – Maryland Calvert
William E. Shay – Alan Kendrick
J. Farrell MacDonald – Colonel Thorpe
Matt B. Snyder – General Hugh Kendrick
Raymond Russell – Floyd Calvert
Marcia Moore – Floyd Calver't Sweetheart
Vivian Reed – Dolly Grey
Doris Baker – True Blue
Herbert Brenon – Lloyd Calvert
Bert Hadley – Private Boone
Joseph Hazelton – The Sexton (*as Joe Hazelton)

See alsoThe Heart of Maryland (1921)The Heart of Maryland'' (1927)

References

External links

 lobby poster
lobby poster

1915 films
American silent feature films
American films based on plays
Lost American films
American black-and-white films
Metro Pictures films
American Civil War films
1910s historical drama films
American historical drama films
1915 lost films
Lost drama films
Films directed by Herbert Brenon
1915 drama films
1910s American films
Silent American drama films